St. Michael's Hospital may refer to the following hospitals:

Canada
St. Michael's Hospital (Toronto)

Ireland
St. Michael's Hospital (Dún Laoghaire)

United Kingdom
St Michael's Hospital, Braintree
St Michael's Hospital, Bristol
St Michael's Hospital, Hayle
St Michael's Hospital, Linlithgow
St Michael's Hospital, Warwick

United States
Saint Michael's Medical Center, an historical hospital in Newark, New Jersey